The Journal of Experimental Botany (JXB) is a peer-reviewed scientific journal published by Oxford University Press on behalf of the Society for Experimental Biology. It covers research on plant biology, focusing on molecular physiology, molecular genetics, and environmental physiology. Some of its content is available under an open access licence. The editor-in-chief is John Lunn (Max Planck Institute of Molecular Plant Physiology).

Research is published in five key areas: growth and development, cell biology, metabolism, plant-environment interactions, and crop molecular genetics.

References

External links
 
 Submission website
 Society for Experimental Biology website
 Journal of Experimental Botany at SCImago Journal Rank
 Journal of Experimental Botany at HathiTrust Digital Library
 Journal of Experimental Botany at Botanical Scientific Journals

Botany journals
Hybrid open access journals
Oxford University Press academic journals
English-language journals
Publications established in 1950